, also simply known as the JMSDF Kure Naval Base, is a group of ports and land facilities of the Japan Maritime Self-Defense Force (JMSDF), which are scattered in multiple districts of Kure City, Hiroshima, and where the Kure District Force, etc. are located.

History
On 1 July 1889,  Kure Naval District was established.

On 1 December 1945, Kure Naval District was reorganized into the Kure District Demobilization Bureau following Japan's Surrender in World War II.

On May 1, 1948, it became a member of the 6th Regional Coast Guard Headquarters at the same time as the establishment of the Japan Coast Guard. In July, the Kure Minesweeper Department was set up.

On 1 August 1952, the National Safety Agency Coastal Safety Force was established, and the Kure Route Enlightenment Corps was newly formed under the control of the Yokosuka District Force.

On 16 September 1953, the Kure Route Enlightenment Corps was abolished, and the Kure District Base corps was newly formed under the control of the Yokosuka District Corps.

On July 1, 1954, the National Safety Agency Coastal Safety Force was abolished to make way for the establishment of the Defense Agency Maritime Self-Defense Force. Kure District Force was reorganized. On October 1st, opening of the Kure District General Administration Department.

On 16 January 1956, new edition of the Kure Training Corps.

On May 10, 1957, it was renamed from the Kure Training Corps to the Kure Education Corps.

On June 1, 1959, new edition of Kure Torai Coordination Center.

On 1 February 1961, Kure Supply Station and Kure Factory were newly reorganized.

On 2 March 1970, abolished Kure Kosakusho and reorganized Kure Zoukousho and Kure Sanitary Corps. On October 1st, renamed from Kure Base Guard to Kure Guard.

On May 11, 1976, new edition of the Kure Music Corps.

On 1 July 1985, the Kure torpedo control station is abolished. New edition of Kure Torai Maintenance Cente.

On July 1, 1987, reorganization of the guards. New edition of Kure Base Service Action.

On 8 December 1998, the Kure Supply Station and the Kure Repair Center were integrated due to the reorganization of the supply and maintenance department, and the Kure Repair Supply Station was reorganized, and the Kure Torai Maintenance Center became the Kure Ammunition Maintenance and Supply Station. 

On 22 March 2002:, the Kure Communication Corps was reorganized into the Kure System Communication Corps and reorganized under the Communications Command Group.

On March 1, 2005, the Self-Defense Forces Kure Hospital was opened.

Facilities and operational units

Sachi District 
Kure District Force
Fleet Escort Force 
4th Escort Flotilla
12th Escort Squadron
1st Training Support Squadron
Training Squadron
1st Training Squadron
Mine Warfare Force
3rd Minesweeper Squadron
1st Landing Ship Squadron 
Kure District Police
Kure System Communication Corps
Kure Guard
Kure Repair Supply Station
Kure Base Service Action
Kure Hygiene Corps
Kure Education Corps
Kure Music Corps

Shōwa District 
Fleet Submarine Force
1st Submarine Squadron 
1st Submarine Training Squadron
Submarine Training Command
Marine training guidance team
Kure Maritime Training Guidance Team
Mine Warfare Support Detachment Kure
Amphibious Warfare / Mine Tactical Support Team
Oceanographic and ASW Support Command
1st Acoustic Measurement Corps
Jieitaikure Hospital

Yoshiura District 
Kure Repair Supply Station Oil Storage Station

Gallery

See also
JMSDF Ōminato Naval Base
JMSDF Yokosuka Naval Base
JMSDF Maizuru Naval Base

References

External links

Kure Naval Base official website

Military installations established in 1953
1953 establishments in Japan
Kure

Japanese Navy submarine bases